Antoine Court (27 March 1696 – 13 June 1760) was a French reformer called the "Restorer of Protestantism in France."  He was born in Villeneuve-de-Berg, in Languedoc, on 27 March 1696 (although at least one writer lists a different date).  His parents were peasants, adherents of the Reformed church, which was then undergoing persecution.  When 17 years old, Court began to speak at the secret meetings of the Protestants, held literally "in dens and caves of the earth," and often in darkness, with no pastor present to teach or counsel.

Antoine (sometimes translated as Anthony) was ordained by Pierre Corties at a Synod in 1718. In his travels he met the young Paul Rabaut and encouraged him to join the ministry of the church.

In 1685, Louis XIV of France had revoked the Edict of Nantes, referred to as the Revocation of the Edict of Nantes or the Edict of Fontainebleau. This caused mass exodus of Protestants.

Proposals
He entertained a great desire to build up the church which was persecuted; and to this end he proposed four things:  
 regular religious meetings for teaching and worship;  
 suppression of the fanaticism of those who professed to be inspired, and of the consequent disorders;  
 restoration of discipline by the establishment of consistories, conferences, and synods;  
 the careful training of a body of pastors.

To the performance of this great task he devoted his life.  From audiences of half a dozen meeting in secret, he came to address openly 10,000 at one time.  In 1715 he convoked the first Synod of the Desert, or synod of the French Reformed Church.

Resistance
In 1724 further fury was hurled at the Protestants in a decree which assumed that there were no Protestants in France and prohibited the most secret exercise of the Reformed religion.  A price was set on Court's head, and in 1730 he fled to Lausanne, Switzerland, where an academy, or seminary, for Protestant ministers had been founded in 1537.  There, after great exertion, he founded a college for the education of the clergy, of which, during the remaining 30 years of his life, he was the chief director.  This college sent forth all of the pastors of the Reformed Church of France until the close of the eighteenth century.  He died at Lausanne on 13 June 1760.

Works
Court intended to write a history of Protestantism and made extensive collections for the purpose, but he did not live to do the work.  He wrote, however,:  
 An Historical Memorial of the Most Remarkable Proceedings Against the Protestants in France from 1744-51 (English translation, London, 1832)  
 Histoire des troubles des Cévennes ou de la guerre des Camisards (1760; new edition, three volumes, Alais, 1819)  
 Autobiography, edited by E. Hugues (Toulouse, 1885)  
 Letters, from 1739, edited by C. Dardier (Paris, 1885; 1891)

See also
 E. Hugues, Antoine Court (Paris, 1872)  
 E. Hugues, Les Synodes du désert (three volumes, Paris, 1885–86)  
 H. M. Baird, The Huguenots and the Revocation of the Edict of Nantes (New York, 1895)  
 Bulletin de la Société de l'Histoire du protestantisme français (Paris, 1893–1906)
 Marie Durand
 Pierre Durand, Huguenot
 Paul Rabaut
 Conventicle

References 

1696 births
1760 deaths
People from Villeneuve-de-Berg
French Calvinist and Reformed ministers
Huguenots
18th-century French historians
French male non-fiction writers
Writers from Auvergne-Rhône-Alpes